Rahim Zahivi(is an Iranian professional footballer who currently plays as a forward for Esteghlal Khuzestan  after the Persian Gulf pro league.  

This football player is from Iran. He has played for the national team of Yasuj Municipality, Masjed Soleiman Oil, Bandar Abbas Municipality, Tehran Oil, Abadan Oil Industry, Esteghlal Khuzestan, Al-Shahaniyeh Qatar, Khuzestan Steel and Saipa  Tehran and Rafsanjan Copper

Club career
Zahivi started his career with Shahrdari Yasuj. Later he joined Naft MIS & Shahrdari Bandar Abbas. In winter 2012 he joined Naft Tehran and made 25 appearances without netting in 1.5 season. In summer 2013 he joined Sanat Naft. After shining with Abadani side in Division 1 while he scored 9 times in 20 games.

Esteghlal Khuzestan
In summer of 2015 Zahivi joined Esteghlal Khuzestan in Persian Gulf Pro League. He was one of the best players in the league for the 2015–16 season and helped Esteghlal Khuzestan win the Persian Gulf Pro League for the first time in club history. Zahivi was named in the Persian Gulf Pro League team of the season for the 2015–16 season.

Joined back from March 2, 2022 till now

Al-Shahania
In January 2017, after rumors that he would sign with Esteghlal, Zahivi decided to leave Iran and sign with Qatar Stars League club Al-Shahania. He assisted in his first match with the club.

International career
Zahivi was called up to the senior Iran squad by Carlos Queiroz for friendlies against Macedonia and Kyrgyzstan in June 2016. However, he was injured in training and could not make his national team debut.

Club career statistics

Honours 
Esteghlal Khuzestan
Persian Gulf Pro League (1): 2015–16
Iranian Super Cup runner-up: 2016

Individual
Persian Gulf Pro League Team of the Year: 2015–16

References

 Foolad vs. Shahr Khodrou Soccerway. Retrieved 31 March 2018.
 Esteghlal Khuzestan vs. Perspolis Soccerway. Retrieved 31 March 2018.
 Tractor vs. Esteghlal Khuzestan Soccerway. Retrieved 25 July 2016.
 Al Wakrah vs. Al Shahaniya Soccerway. Retrieved 17 February 2017.

External links
 Rahim Zahivi at PersianLeague.com
 
 
 Rahim Zahivi at playmakerstats.com
 Rahim Zahivi at Eurosport.com
 ‌Rahim Zahivi at iranleague.ir
 
 
 Rahim Zahivi at metafootball

1987 births
Living people
Iranian footballers
Iranian expatriate footballers
Naft Tehran F.C. players
Sanat Naft Abadan F.C. players
Esteghlal Khuzestan players
People from Ahvaz
Association football forwards
Al-Shahania SC players
Qatar Stars League players
Persian Gulf Pro League players
Azadegan League players
Expatriate footballers in Qatar
Mes Rafsanjan players
Foolad FC players
Saipa F.C. players
Zob Ahan Esfahan F.C. players
Shahrdari Bandar Abbas players
Naft Maysan FC players
Sportspeople from Khuzestan province